Pietro Blayer (born 1901 — died 24 March 1978 in Rome, Italy) was a notable Jewish Italian community leader. Succeeding Sergio Piperno Beer, Blayer was President of the Union of Italian Jewish Communities from 1976 until his death.

References

1901 births
1978 deaths
Presidents of the Union of Italian Jewish Communities